Bradley Clark Hosmer (born October 8, 1937)  is a retired lieutenant general in the United States Air Force (USAF). He served as the twelfth Superintendent of the United States Air Force Academy in Colorado Springs, Colorado from 1991 to 1994.  He was the first Academy graduate to return as superintendent.

Education and training
Hosmer was born in San Antonio, Texas in 1937. He earned his Bachelor of Science degree in 1959 from the United States Air Force Academy, where he was the top graduate of the Academy's first graduating class.  He subsequently won a Rhodes Scholarship and earned his master's degree in international relations from Oxford University, England. Hosmer is also a graduate of the USAF Squadron Officer School, the Naval Command and Staff College and the National War College.

Military assignment history
Hosmer served in a variety of staff positions, including vice director of the Joint Staff and Air Force Inspector General. He commanded the 479th Tactical Training Wing, Holloman Air Force Base, New Mexico from 1978 to 1979; the 347th Tactical Fighter Wing, Moody Air Force Base, Georgia from 1979 to 1981; and  the 831st Air Division, George Air Force Base, California from 1981 to 1982. From 1986 to 1989, he served as president of the National Defense University, Fort McNair, Washington, D.C. Hosmer was a command pilot with more than 4,000 flying hours, in aircraft to include the T-33 Shooting Star, T-37 Tweet, AT-38 Talon, O-1 Bird Dog, F-4 Phantom II, F-16 Fighting Falcon, F-15 Eagle, F-100 Super Sabre and F-111 Aardvark.

Awards and decorations
His decorations include the Defense Distinguished Service Medal, the Defense Superior Service Medal, the Legion of Merit with oak leaf cluster, the Distinguished Flying Cross, the Bronze Star  with oak leaf cluster, the Meritorious Service Medal, the Air Medal with four oak leaf clusters, and the Air Force Commendation Medal.

  Command Pilot Badge
  Office of the Joint Chiefs of Staff Identification Badge
  Defense Distinguished Service Medal
  Defense Superior Service Medal
  Legion of Merit with oak leaf cluster
  Distinguished Flying Cross
  Bronze Star with oak leaf cluster
  Meritorious Service Medal
  Air Medal with four oak leaf clusters
  Air Force Commendation Medal
  Air Force Outstanding Unit Award
  National Defense Service Medal
  Vietnam Service Medal with three bronze service stars
  Air Force Overseas Short Tour Service Ribbon
  Air Force Overseas Long Tour Service Ribbon with oak leaf cluster
  Air Force Longevity Service Award with seven oak leaf clusters
  Marksmanship Ribbon
  Air Force Training Ribbon
  Gallantry Cross (Vietnam) unit citation
  Vietnam Campaign Medal

References

External links

1937 births
Living people
United States Air Force Academy alumni
Superintendents of the United States Air Force Academy
Presidents of the National Defense University
United States Air Force generals
Recipients of the Legion of Merit
Recipients of the Distinguished Flying Cross (United States)
United States Air Force personnel of the Vietnam War
American Rhodes Scholars
National War College alumni
Recipients of the Air Medal
Recipients of the Order of the Sword (United States)
Recipients of the Defense Superior Service Medal
Recipients of the Defense Distinguished Service Medal